Fort Donelson was a fortress built early in 1862 by the Confederacy during the American Civil War to control the Cumberland River, which led to the heart of Tennessee, and thereby the Confederacy. The fort was named after Confederate general Daniel S. Donelson.

The Union Army of the Tennessee, commanded by Major General Ulysses S. Grant, who later became president, captured the fort in February 1862 from the Confederate Army in the Battle of Fort Donelson. This was a great strategic victory for the Union forces, and part of Grant's campaign to gain control of the Mississippi River. Union forces occupied the fort (and much of Tennessee) for the remainder of the war. A small detachment of Confederate troops made one unsuccessful attempt in 1863 to regain it.

History
Bushrod Johnson of the Confederate Corps of Engineers had approved the build site and supervised construction completed in early 1862.  The site commanded a bend on the west side of the Cumberland River, It was planned to support Fort Henry, which is located on a bend in the Tennessee River about 10 miles to the west.  To the north flows Hickman River, a backwater channel that was impassable except by boat or bridge, and to the east a small tributary named Indian Creek enters the Cumberland.  The fort, which was intended to house troops and protect the water batteries from sorties, had a few acres of log huts.  

Like Fort Henry, which fell to Union troops on February 6, Fort Donelson would not be able to defeat a large-scale assault, but officers wanted to be able hold the position as long as possible.  Engineers began improving defensive positions by digging rifle pits along a ridgeline and breastworks were built in "a three-mile arc which inclosed  the bluff on the north, and the county seat hamlet of Dover on the south, the main supply base."  Cannons, including a 128-pounder and two 32-pounders, were placed atop the hundred-foot bluff within the arc.  Construction was started by a large force of workers brought from the nearby Cumberland Iron Works.

Confederate commanders
 Bushrod Johnson (Feb 9, 1862)
 Gideon J. Pillow (Feb 10–13, 1862)
 John B. Floyd (Feb 14–16, 1862)
 Simon B. Buckner, Sr. (Feb 16, 1862)
 Major Rice E. Graves, Jr., Artillery Commander

Fort Donelson was garrisoned by the Confederate troops until 1862. The fort was captured by Union General Ulysses S. Grant and his army during a winter offensive to control of the Mississippi River. Grant believed that such control would enable him to divide the Confederacy in two. (see Battle of Fort Donelson)

On August 25, 1863, a Confederate force attacked the fort and demanded surrender by Union troops. Their attack was unsuccessful and was repulsed by the Union garrison.

Union attack

Fort Donelson was attacked by General U.S Grant and Flag Officer Andrew Foote, who surrounded the fort and captured it after a short siege. On February 6, Grant was ordered by General Henry Halleck to assault Fort Donelson immediately and capture it by February 8.  Grant made reconnaissance, observed the natural obstacles and Confederate improvements, and knew the fort would not be taken by the 8th.  He organized and had Brigadier Generals John A. McClernand, Charles F. Smith, and Lew Wallace prepare for a land assault while Flag Officer Foote moved his gunboats to assault from the river.  After minor skirmishes with Confederate cavalry en route, the assault on Fort Donelson began on February 12.  On February 14, a naval battle took place, in which Union ships suffered serious damage.  After attempting in vain to escape their tenuous position on February 15 via roads to Nashville, the Confederates capitulated, surrendering Fort Donelson to the Union on February 16.

Fort Donelson under Union control

The Union was ecstatic when the news of Fort Donelson's surrender reached the capital and cities. Union forces now controlled one of the largest forts in the western theater. The war had been going badly for the Union in Virginia, but the captures of Fort Henry and Fort Donelson were promising victories.

After the front line shifted away from Fort Donelson, it became of little strategic importance, but continued to hold a garrison of Union troops. Later, the fort was attacked by a Confederate force of 450 infantrymen, 335 cavalrymen, and two field guns. The Union garrison consisted of four companies (404 men) of the 71st Ohio Regiment.  After suffering 30 casualties, the Confederates retreated. They were pursued by the Fifth Iowa Cavalry, but to no avail.

Union commanders
 Ulysses S. Grant (Feb 1862)
 Abner Harding (Sept 1862–1863)
 William W. Lowe (Feb 1863)

After the war

The Fort Donelson National Battlefield was created in 1928, and the park was listed on the National Register of Historic Places on October 15, 1966. It was redesignated as a national battlefield on August 16, 1985. Fort Heiman was later incorporated into the park.

References

Further reading
 American Battlefield Protection Program (U.S.). Profiles of America's Most Threatened Civil War Battlefields. [Harper's Ferry, W. Va.]: U.S. Department of the Interior, National Park Service, National Center for Cultural Resources Stewardship and Partnership Program, Heritage Preservation Services, American Battlefield Protection Program, 1998. 
 Bearss, Edwin C. Unconditional Surrender: The Fall of Fort Donelson. Dover, Tenn: Eastern National Park and Monument Association, Fort Donelson National Military Park, 1962. 
 Bishop, Randy. Tennessee's Civil War Battlefields: A Guide to Their History and Preservation. Gretna, La: Pelican Pub. Co, 2010.  
 Confederate States of America. Facts and Incidents of the Siege, Defence and Fall of Fort Donelson, February, 1862. Huntsville, Ala. : Printed at the Confederate Office, 1863. 
 Cooling, Benjamin Franklin. Fort Donelson's Legacy: War and Society in Kentucky and Tennessee, 1862–1863. Knoxville : University of Tennessee Press, 1997.  
 Cutter, Bloodgood H. On the Battle of Fort Donelson. Little Neck? N.Y.: s.n, 1862. 
 Davis, William C., and David Muench. Civil War Parks: The Story Behind the Scenery. Las Vegas, NV : KC Publications, 1996.  
 Gifford, Douglas L. Fort Donelson Battlefield Tour Guide. Winfield, Mo: Douglas L. Gifford, 2008.  
 Greenawalt, John G. A Charge at Fort Donelson, February 15, 1862. Washington, 1902. 
 Hamilton, James J. The Battle of Fort Donelson. South Brunswick: T. Yoseloff, 1968. 
 Hicks, Henry George. Fort Donelson. [St. Paul, Minn.]: [s.n.], 1896. 
 Kennedy, Frances H. The Civil War Battlefield Guide. Boston: Houghton Mifflin, 1990.  
 Knight, James R. The Battle of Fort Donelson: No Terms but Unconditional Surrender. Charleston, SC : The History Press, 2011.   
 Logsdon, David R. Eyewitnesses at the Battle of Fort Donelson. Nashville, Tenn. : Kettle Mills Press, 1998.  
 Silkenat, David. Raising the White Flag: How Surrender Defined the American Civil War. Chapel Hill: University of North Carolina Press, 2019. .
 Tucker, Spencer. Unconditional Surrender: The Capture of Forts Henry and Donelson. Abilene, Tex: McWhiney Foundation Press, 2001.  
 United States. Fort Donelson National Battlefield, Tennessee. [Washington, D.C.?]: National Park Service, U.S. Dept. of the Interior, 1999. 
 United States. Fort Donelson National Military Park, Tennessee. [Washington, D.C.?]: National Park Service, U.S. Dept. of the Interior, 1979. 
 Vandiver, Frank Everson. Civil War Battlefields and Landmarks: A Guide to the National Park Sites : with Official National Park Service Maps for Each Site. New York: Random House, 1996.

External links
 Fort Henry and Fort Donelson
 Battle of Fort Donelson
 The Battle of Fort Donelson
 Battle of Fort Donelson
 The Battle of Fort Donelson, Tennessee
 Fort Donelson
 Battle of Fort Donelson
 Capture of Donelson
 Fort Donelson
 Fort Donelson National Battlefield
 Fort Donelson National Battlefield
 Battle of Fort Donelson
 Fort Donelson
 Battle of Fort Donelson-February 13–16, 1862
 

1862 establishments in Tennessee
Dover, Tennessee
Donelson
Donelson